220 is an instrumental album by guitarist Phil Keaggy, released in 1996. In contrast to Acoustic Sketches, songs are performed using electric guitar. The album reached No. 21 on the Top Contemporary Christian chart.

Track listing 
All songs written by Phil Keaggy.

 "Animal" - 4:49
 "Arrow" - 6:02
 "Montana" - 4:44
 "Tennessee Morning" - 3:55
 "Great Escape" - 7:12
 "Stomp" - 4:40
 "Highland" - 5:52
 "Beyond This Day" - 4:22
 "Ian's Groove" - 3:35
 "Watt Ever (220 Jam)" - 3:18

Personnel 

 Phil Keaggy – guitar (1-10), bass guitar (3, 8, 9), drums (3), tambourine (3), synthesizer (8)
 Phil Madeira – Hammond B3 organ (1, 9), slide guitar (9)
 Patrick Leonard – claves (1, 6), keyboards (2, 4), acoustic piano (4, 5, 7), Hammond B3 organ (5, 6), synthesizer (6, 7)
 Spencer Campbell – bass guitar (1, 2, 4-7, 10)
 Lynn Williams – drums (1, 2, 4-8, 10), cymbal (9)
 Ian Keaggy – drums (9)
 Eric Darken – percussion (3, 4, 6, 7, 8)
 Blair Masters – drum loop programming (5)
 Chris Carmichael – fiddle (7)
 Hunter Lee – Scottish war pipes (7), tin whistle (7)
 Pat Bergeson – harmonica (9)

Production

 Bill Deaton – producer, audio engineer, mixing
 John Mays – executive producer
 Phil Keaggy – additional engineer
 Patrick Kelly – assistant engineer
 Amanda Sears – assistant engineer
 Aaron Swihart – assistant engineer
 Darren Smith – mix assistant
 Carry Summers – mix assistant
 Doug Sax – mastering 
 Javelina Recording Studios, Nashville, Tennessee – recording location.
 Kegworth Studio, Nashville, Tennessee – recording location.
 OmniSound Studios, Nashville, Tennessee – recording location.
 Gambit Studio, Gallatin, Tennessee – mixing location.
 The Mastering Lab, Hollywood, California – mastering location.
 Charles Garrett – guitar technician 
 Karen Philpott – creative director
 Bruce Ellefson – design
 Rich Borge – cover illustration
 Ron Keith – photography 
 Jamie Kearney – stylist
 Lori Turk – hair and makeup

References

1996 albums
Phil Keaggy albums